Narvik Zagidinoviç Sırxayev (born 16 March 1974) is a former Soviet and Azerbaijani footballer and a football coach of Lezgin origin. He also holds Russian citizenship.

National team statistics

International goals

Honors
 Russian Super Cup: 2003

References

1974 births
People from Suleyman-Stalsky District
Azerbaijani people of Lezgian descent
Living people
Soviet footballers
Azerbaijani footballers
Azerbaijani expatriate footballers
Azerbaijan international footballers
Russian Premier League players
FC Anzhi Makhachkala players
FC Lokomotiv Moscow players
FC Moscow players
FC Akhmat Grozny players
Expatriate footballers in Russia
Azerbaijani football managers
Soviet Azerbaijani people
Association football midfielders
FC Dynamo Makhachkala players
Sportspeople from Dagestan